American singer Lady Gaga has released five solo studio albums, two collaborative studio albums, two film soundtracks, three remix albums, two compilation albums, four EPs, two live albums, 39 singles (including three as a featured artist), and 14 promotional singles. Gaga made her debut in August 2008 with the studio album The Fame, which peaked at number two in the United States, where it was subsequently certified triple Platinum, while topping the charts in Austria, Canada, Germany, Switzerland, and the United Kingdom. Its first two singles, "Just Dance" and "Poker Face", reached number one in Australia, Canada, the United Kingdom, and the United States, and for the latter, becoming the world's biggest single of the 2009 calendar year. The album spawned three more singles: "Eh, Eh (Nothing Else I Can Say)", "LoveGame" and "Paparazzi". The latter reached the top ten in many countries worldwide, and number one in Germany.

Gaga later released The Fame Monster in November 2009, as a deluxe edition or reissue of The Fame, which was ultimately released also as a standalone EP. It reached number one in Australia, New Zealand, and the United Kingdom, as well as number five in the United States, where it was certified Platinum. Its lead single, "Bad Romance", became an international hit and reached number one in twelve countries while peaking at number two in the United States. Subsequent singles, "Telephone" and "Alejandro", were top ten hits in many countries. Consisting of various remixes of songs from both The Fame and The Fame Monster, Gaga's first compilation album The Remix was released in 2010. It peaked at number six in the United States while reaching the top five in Canada and the United Kingdom. The remix album has sold 500,000 copies worldwide, therefore making it one of the best-selling remix albums of all time.

The singer's second studio album, Born This Way, was released in May 2011 and reached the number-one spot in the United States along with twenty other countries. Its eponymous lead single was an international success, peaking at number one in nineteen countries including the United States, where it became her third number-one single. The other singles from the album were "Judas", "The Edge of Glory", "You and I", "Marry the Night", and "Bloody Mary". Gaga's third studio album, Artpop, was released in November 2013 and includes the singles "Applause" and "Do What U Want". In September 2014, Gaga and Tony Bennett released the collaborative album Cheek to Cheek, which debuted at number one in the US, becoming Gaga's third consecutive number one album. Her fifth album, Joanne, was released in October 2016. Its lead single, "Perfect Illusion", debuted at number one in France, while second single "Million Reasons" reached number four in the US. When Joanne reached number one in the US, Gaga became the first woman to have four number-one albums in the nation during the 2010s. She extended the record in 2018 with the release of the soundtrack to A Star Is Born. The soundtrack and its lead single, "Shallow", were international hits, reaching number one in the United States, Australia, New Zealand, Switzerland, and the United Kingdom. Her sixth studio album, Chromatica (2020), similarly topped the charts in numerous countries around the world, and also featured the single, "Rain on Me", which topped the charts in the US, Canada, the UK and several other territories. In September 2021, she released another collaborative album with Bennett titled Love for Sale. Gaga subsequently recorded "Hold My Hand" for the 2022 film Top Gun: Maverick and composed its score alongside Lorne Balfe, Harold Faltermeyer, and Hans Zimmer.

Gaga is one of the world's best-selling music artists, with estimated sales of 170 million records as of 2018, and has produced some of the best-selling singles of all time. She has also sold around 7.25 million singles in the United Kingdom, and 11.46 million albums in the US; in the latter country she is the first and only artist to have two songs pass 7 million downloads sold ("Poker Face" and "Just Dance"). According to the Recording Industry Association of America (RIAA), as of October 2022, Gaga is the fourteenth top digital singles artist in the United States, with cumulative single certifications of 85.5 million digital downloads and on-demand streaming, being the first woman to receive the Digital Diamond Award certification from RIAA, one of three artists with at least two Diamond certified songs ("Bad Romance" and "Poker Face"). By the end of 2020, with "Just Dance", "Poker Face", "Bad Romance" and "Shallow", she also became the first female artist to achieve four singles that sold at least 10 million copies globally.

Albums

Solo studio albums

Collaborative studio albums

Reissues

Soundtrack albums

Remix albums

Compilation albums

Video albums

Extended plays

Singles

As lead artist

As featured artist

Promotional singles

Other charted and certified songs

See also 
 List of songs recorded by Lady Gaga

Notes

References

External links 
 
 
 
 

Discographies of American artists
Electronic music discographies
Discography
Pop music discographies